A Holiday with Piroschka is a 1965 comedy film directed by Franz Josef Gottlieb and starring Marie Versini, Götz George, and Dietmar Schönherr. It was a co-production between Austria, Hungary and West Germany. Despite their similar names, the film has little in common with the 1955 I Often Think of Piroschka.

Cast
Marie Versini as Tery
Götz George as Thomas Laurends
Dietmar Schönherr as Alfi Trattenbach
Gisela Uhlen as Mrs. Laurends
Liselotte Bav as Ilona
István Bujtor
Hilda Gobbi as Katalin
János Görbe as Pali-Bacsi
Teri Tordai as Karin

References

External links

West German films
German romantic comedy films
Austrian romantic comedy films
Hungarian romantic comedy films
1965 romantic comedy films
Films directed by Franz Josef Gottlieb
Films set in Hungary
1960s German-language films
1960s German films